William Slater (17 November 1790 – 9 March 1852) was an English professional cricketer.  His brother was John Slater.

He mainly played for Sussex sides and made 29 appearances in first-class matches from 1815 to 1829. Slater was a left-handed batsman and an occasional wicket-keeper.

References

1790 births
1852 deaths
English cricketers
English cricketers of 1787 to 1825
English cricketers of 1826 to 1863
Sussex cricketers
Players cricketers
Left-Handed v Right-Handed cricketers
William Ward's XI cricketers
Lord Frederick Beauclerk's XI cricketers
Non-international England cricketers
Wicket-keepers